Lalian is a city in the Chiniot District of Punjab province, in Pakistan. It is located at 31°49'21N 72°47'50E with an altitude of 171 metres (564 feet) and is situated on the Faisalabad-to-Sargodha road. 

According to the census of 1998, Lalian holds total population of 90,000. The total number of households was 4436.

History 
Initially this place was a village with land mainly owned by Lali clan, and a place where different sub tribes of Lali clan used to reside., family of Lali clan is currently a politically powerful family of the area. Details about Lali Clan are to be found in books named Kulyat_e_Sadiqquie, and Kulyat-e-Lali, written by Professor Riaz Ahmed Shad. The author has traced the history of Lali clan and linked them with the great Muslim hero, Tipu Sultan.
The police station of Lalian was established in 1867 during the British rule, the high school was also established during the British rule in 1918 as was the Rural Health Center. It has a technical training center managed under TEVTA and also has a veterinary hospital. Nadra office is shifted in Lalian on 11-07-2011 which is operating near grain market.

Government 
Lalian was formed via town committee along with Garh Maharaja in 1928, and with the establishment of Chiniot District it became tehsil in 2009.
Lalian is the only transit market for more than 100 villages. At present the population of Lalian is not less than 2 lakhs. It has a digital telephone exchange, broadband internet connection and other facilities of communication. 

The overall incharge of the Tehsil is Assistant Commissioner by his designation. The following Assistant Commissioners have served in Sub Division Lalian since its creation.

See also 
 Lalian Tehsil
 Chiniot
 Chiniot Tehsil
 Bhawana
 Bhawana Tehsil
 Sheikhan

References 

Chiniot District
Populated places in Chiniot District
Cities in Punjab (Pakistan)